Huamelula may refer to:

San Pedro Huamelula, Oaxaca, Mexico
Huamelula language